Mount Saint Elias (also designated Boundary Peak 186), the second-highest mountain in both Canada and the United States, stands on the Yukon and Alaska border about  southwest of Mount Logan, the highest mountain in Canada. The Canadian side of Mount Saint Elias forms part of Kluane National Park and Reserve, while the U.S. side of the mountain is located within Wrangell-St. Elias National Park and Preserve.

History and features 

The name of the mountain in Tlingit, Yasʼéitʼaa Shaa, means "mountain behind Icy Bay"; the Yakutat Tlingit occasionally call it Shaa Tlein "Big Mountain". It is one of the most important crests of the Kwaashkʼiḵwáan clan, who used it as a guide during their journey down the Copper River. Mount Fairweather at the apex of the British Columbia and Alaska borders at the head of the Alaska Panhandle is known as Tsalx̱aan; legend states that this mountain and Yasʼéitʼaa Shaa (Mt. St. Elias) originally stood next to each other, but had an argument and separated. Their children, the mountains in between the two peaks, are called Tsalx̱aan Yátxʼi ("Children of Tsalxaan").

European explorers first sighted the mountain on July 16, 1741, with the arrival of the expedition commanded by Vitus Bering, a Danish explorer in service of Russia. While some historians contend that Bering named the mountain, others believe that eighteenth-century mapmakers named it after Cape Saint Elias when Bering left the peak unnamed.

Mount Saint Elias is notable for its immense vertical relief. Its summit rises  vertically  in just  horizontal distance from the head of Taan Fjord, off of Icy Bay.

In 2007 Gerald Salmina directed an Austrian documentary film, Mount St. Elias, about a team of skier/mountaineers determined to make "the planet's longest skiing descent" by ascending the mountain and then skiing nearly all 18,000 feet down to the Gulf of Alaska; the movie finished editing and underwent limited release in 2009.

Climbing history 

Mt. St. Elias was first climbed on July 31, 1897, by an Italian expedition led by famed explorer Prince Luigi Amedeo, Duke of the Abruzzi, (who also reconnoitered the current standard route on K2 in 1909) and included noted mountain photographer Vittorio Sella.

The second ascent was not until 1946, when a group from the Harvard Mountaineering Club including noted mountain historian Dee Molenaar climbed the Southwest Ridge route. The summit party comprised Molenaar, his brother Cornelius, Andrew and Betty Kauffman, Maynard Miller, William Latady, and Benjamin Ferris.  William Putnam was a member of the expedition but did not make the summit. They used eleven camps, eight of which were on the approach from Icy Bay, and three of which were on the mountain. They were supported by multiple air drops of food.

The first winter ascent was made on February 13, 1996, by David Briggs, Gardner Heaton and Joe Reichert. The team had originally planned to begin their ascent from the ocean and cross the Tyndall Glacier but the terrain was in very poor condition.

Mount Saint Elias is infrequently climbed today, despite its height, because it has no easy route to the summit and because of its prolonged periods of bad weather (mainly snow and low visibility).

Routes 
 Abruzzi Ridge
 Livermore Ridge

See also

List of mountain peaks of North America
List of mountain peaks of Canada
List of mountain peaks of the United States
List of Boundary Peaks of the Alaska-British Columbia/Yukon border

References

Works cited

External links

 

Mountains of Alaska
Five-thousanders of Yukon
Saint Elias Mountains
Highest points of United States national parks
Mountains of Yakutat City and Borough, Alaska
Wrangell–St. Elias National Park and Preserve
Kluane National Park and Reserve
Canada–United States border
International mountains of North America
Mount Saint Elias